Yaakov "Jack" Rosner (1902 in Munich – 1950) was an Israeli photographer.

Biography 
Born in Munich, Rosner became aware of his Jewish background following antisemitic incidents at his school, leading him to become an active Zionist. He became a leader of the Zionist youth group Blau-Weiss (Blue and White) in Munich. He achieved a degree in economics at the University of Frankfurt, and briefly worked for the newspaper Frankfurter Zeitung. In 1926, he married Margot Klausner in Berlin, and they spent six months on honeymoon in Eretz Israel.

In 1926-27 he traveled to the United States to study advertising, where he met Alfred Stieglitz, who would become a great influence on his work. In 1928, Klausner and Rosner took part in the moving of Habima Theatre from Moscow to Tel Aviv.

Rosner made aliyah in 1936, and started a new family in Tel Aviv. He served as a photographer for the Jewish National Fund.

Style 
Yaakov Rosner was a pioneering Israeli photographer who documented early Land of Israel events. Rosner developed a style which was a cross of sorts between documentary and staged photography. The subjects in these photographs were always handsome, strong, happy, and hard-working. When reality was incongruent with the expectations, it was staged in a pseudo-documentary fashion.

Gallery

Education
 1926–27 US, with photographer Alfred Stieglitz

Exhibitions
 1991 "Yaakov Rosner 1930–1950", The Israel Museum, Jerusalem
 2006 Haifa in the Eye of the Camera – The First Half of the 20th Century, Haifa City Museum

References

External links 

 
 
 
 Photo Archive of the Keren Kayemet L'yisrael (Jewish National Fund) see under צלם=רוזנר
 Online Photo gallery: he.bestpicturesof.com

Israeli photographers
1902 births
1950 deaths
Journalists from Munich
Goethe University Frankfurt alumni
Jewish emigrants from Nazi Germany to Mandatory Palestine
German Zionists
Early photographers in Palestine